The 1993–94 season of the European Cup Winners' Cup was won by English club Arsenal, who beat defending champions Parma in the final. The tournament would be renamed to the UEFA Cup Winners' Cup the following season.

Teams
Lithuania, Latvia, Estonia, Belarus, Croatia entered for the first time, as Czechoslovakia split between Czech Republic and Slovakia.

  KS Albpetrol
  Tirol Innsbruck
  Neman Grodno
  Standard Liège
  CSKA Sofia
  Hajduk Split
  APOEL
  Boby Brno
  Odense BK
  Arsenal
  Nikol Tallinn
  HB Tórshavn
  MyPa
  Paris Saint Germain
  Bayer Leverkusen
  Panathinaikos
  Ferencváros
  Valur
  Maccabi Haifa
  Torino
  Parma
  RAF Jelgava
  Balzers
  Žalgiris Vilnius
  F91 Dudelange
  Sliema Wanderers
  Ajax
  Bangor
  Lillestrøm
  GKS Katowice
  Benfica
  Shelbourne
  Universitatea Craiova
  Torpedo Moscow
  Aberdeen
  Košice
  Publikum Celje
  Real Madrid
  Degerfors
  Lugano
  Beşiktaş
  Karpaty Lviv
  Cardiff City

Qualifying round

|}

First leg

Second leg

Shelbourne won 3–2 on aggregate.

Awarded to HB. RAF Jelgava not came on match cause their flight was postponed. Tórshavn won 3–1 on aggregate.

Degerfors won 1–6 on aggregate.

APOEL won 2–3 on aggregate.

Maccabi Haifa won 1–7 on aggregate.

Valur won 4–1 on aggregate.

Balzers won 3–1 on aggregate.

 
Lillestrøm won 1–8 on aggregate.

Košice won 3–1 on aggregate.

Lugano won 6–2 on aggregate.

Odense won 0–1 on aggregate.

First round

|}

First leg

Second leg

Tirol Innsbruck won 5–1 on aggregate.

Real Madrid won 6–1 on aggregate.

Paris Saint-Germain won 3-0 on aggregate.

Universitatea Craiova won 7–0 on aggregate.

Torino won 3–2 on aggregate.

Aberdeen won 7–0 on aggregate.

Arsenal won 3–2 on aggregate.

Standard Liège won 8–3 on aggregate.

Benfica won 2–1 on aggregate.

CSKA Sofia won 11–1 on aggregate.

Panathinaikos won 5–1 on aggregate.

Bayer Leverkusen won 5–0 on aggregate.

Ajax won 6–1 on aggregate.

Beşiktaş won 3–2 on aggregate.

Maccabi Haifa won 3–2 on aggregate.

Parma won 4–1 on aggregate.

Second round

|}

First leg

Second leg

Real Madrid won 1–4 on aggregate.

Paris Saint-Germain won 6–0 on aggregate.

Torino won 5–3 on aggregate.

Arsenal won 10–0 on aggregate.

Benfica won 6–2 on aggregate.

Bayer Leverkusen won 5–3 on aggregate.

Ajax won 6–1 on aggregate.

1–1 on aggregate; Parma won 3–1 on penalties.

Quarter-finals

|}

First leg

Second leg

5–5 on aggregate; Benfica won on away goals.

Paris Saint-Germain won 2–1 on aggregate.

Arsenal won 1–0 on aggregate.

Parma won 2–0 on aggregate.

Semi-finals

|}

First leg

Second leg

Arsenal won 2–1 on aggregate.2–2 on aggregate; Parma won on away goals.''

Final

Top goalscorers
The top goalscorers from the 1993–94 European Cup Winners' Cup are as follows:

References

External links
 1993–94 competition at UEFA website
 Cup Winners' Cup results at Rec.Sport.Soccer Statistics Foundation

3
UEFA Cup Winners' Cup seasons